Paskov is a town in Frýdek-Místek District in the Moravian-Silesian Region of the Czech Republic. It has about 3,800 inhabitants.

Administrative parts
The village of Oprechtice is an administrative part of Paskov.

Geography
Paskov is situated between Ostrava and Frýdek-Místek. It lies in the Ostrava Basin, at the confluence of the Ostravice river and Olešná stream.

History

The first written mention of Paskov is from 1267, in a deed of bishop Bruno von Schauenburg. At the end of the 13th century, a fortress was built here.

The municipality became a town in 2011.

Economy
Paskov was known for the Paskov Mine, where hard coal was mined from 1966 to 1999.

The town is known for the industrial company Lenzing Biocel Paskov, a pulp producer which employs about 400 people.

Sights
The main landmark is the Paskov Castle. The fortress was rebuilt into a Renaissance residence in the late 16th century. After the damage suffered in the Thirty Years' War, it was reconstructed in the Baroque style. The castle was nationalised after World War II and from 1950 to 2004 it housed an oncology hospital. Since 2013, the castle complex with a naturally valuable part of the castle park has been owned by the town. Today the building houses a museum and serves cultural and social purposes.

The Baroque complex of the Church of Saint Lawrence was built in 1740–1746 and expanded in 1828.

Notable people
Edmund Reitter (1845–1920), Austrian entomologist, writer and collector; died here
Bohumír Dvorský (1902–1976), painter
Zdeněk Koubek (1913–1986), track athlete and rugbist

References

External links

 

Cities and towns in the Czech Republic
Populated places in Frýdek-Místek District
Mining communities in the Czech Republic